Stephen T. Liddle FRSE FRSC is a British professor of inorganic chemistry at the University of Manchester. He is Head of Inorganic Chemistry and Co-Director of the Centre for Radiochemistry Research at the University of Manchester since 2015.

Early life and education 

Liddle was born near Sunderland, in the North East of England, in 1974. In 1997 he graduated with a BSc(Hons) in chemistry with applied chemistry from Newcastle University. His degree included a year working as a research scientist for ICI Performance Chemicals at Wilton, Teesside. Alongside a stint in the Territorial Army, Liddle continued his studies at the university and received his PhD in 2000. His PhD supervisor was Professor W. Clegg.

Career and research 

After postdoctoral fellowships with P. J. Bailey at the University of Edinburgh, Keith Izod at Newcastle University as the Wilfred Hall Research Fellow, and Polly Arnold at the University of Nottingham, Liddle began his independent academic career at the University of Nottingham with a Royal Society University Research Fellowship (2007–2015) held with a proleptic Lectureship. He was promoted to Associate Professor and Reader in 2010 and Professor of Inorganic Chemistry in 2013.

He moved to the University of Manchester in 2015 as Head of Inorganic Chemistry and Co-Director of the Centre for Radiochemistry Research. He held an Engineering and Physical Sciences Research Council Established Career Fellowship (2015–2021).

He was Chairman of COST Action CM1006, a 22 country, research network of over 120 research groups in f-block chemistry (2011–2015), is an advisor to the Commonwealth Scholarship Commission (2013–), and was an elected category 3 member of Senate, the University of Manchester (2016–2019).

Liddle's research is focused on synthetic inorganic chemistry, particularly making early transition metal, lanthanide, and actinide complexes to explore their structure, bonding, reactivity, and magnetism. In 2011 he reported a single-molecule magnet based on depleted uranium. In 2012 his research group was the first to synthesize a molecular terminal uranium(V) nitride.
In 2013 he reported the isolation of a terminal uranium(VI) nitride akin to examples previously restricted to cryogenic matrix isolation experiments. Also in 2013, his research group disclosed the first f-element cyclobutadienyl complexes.  In 2015 he reported a uranium(IV)-arsenido complex containing uranium-arsenic triple bonds. In 2019 his research group isolated a uranium(V)-dinitrogen complex. In 2021, Liddle reported a tri-thorium cluster featuring σ-aromatic actinide metal-metal bonding. Before the synthesis of this complex, examples of actinide-actinide bonding had been restricted to matrix isolation experiments and fullerene-encapsulated species.
In 2022, he reported a terminal neptunium(V)-mono(oxo) complex. Before the synthesis of this complex all transuranium-ligand multiple bond complexes required two or more metal-ligand multiple bonds to be stable.

Honours and awards 

Liddle was elected Fellow of the Royal Society of Chemistry (FRSC) in 2011 and is Vice President to the Executive Committee of the European Rare Earth and Actinide Society (2012–).

He was elected to the Fellowship of the Royal Society of Edinburgh, Scotland’s National Academy of Science and Letters in 2022. 

He was awarded the RSC Sir Edward Frankland Fellowship (2011), the RSC Radiochemistry Group Bill Newton Award (2011), the RSC Corday-Morgan Prize (2015), and the RSC Tilden Prize (2020).

He was a recipient of a Rising Star Award at the 41st International Conference on Coordination Chemistry (2014).

He was awarded an Alexander von Humboldt Foundation Friedrich Wilhelm Bessel Research award (2019).

He was awarded a European Research Council (ERC) Starter Grant (2009) and Consolidator Grant (2014).

He was one of the Periodic Videos team awarded the IChemE Petronas award for excellence in education and training (2008).

Popular science 

Liddle is known for his work on The Periodic Table of Videos, a series of videos from the University of Nottingham presented on YouTube, which feature educational vignettes on the periodic table.

He is executive producer for Chemistry at Manchester Explains Research Advances (CAMERA), a series of videos from the University of Manchester presented on YouTube, which feature videos explaining chemistry research papers published from the University of Manchester.

He is a National Co-ordinating Centre for Public Engagement Ambassador (2013–).

References

British chemists
Academics of the University of Nottingham
Living people
Academics of the University of Manchester
Alumni of Newcastle University
Inorganic chemists
Year of birth missing (living people)
Rare earth scientists